Shingobee Township is a township in Cass County, Minnesota, United States. The population was 1,745 as of the 2000 census. This township took its name from the Shingobee River.

Geography
There are two townships, North and South and according to the United States Census Bureau, the townships have a total area of 71.8 square miles (185.9 km), of which 53.7 square miles (139.1 km) is land and 18.1 square miles (46.8 km) (25.16%) is water.

The city of Walker is entirely within this township geographically but is a separate entity.

Unincorporated communities
 Ah-gwah-ching
 Onigum

Major highways
  Minnesota State Highway 34
  Minnesota State Highway 200
  Minnesota State Highway 371

Lakes
 3rd Lake
 4th Lake
 5th Lake
 6th Lake
 Anoway Lake
 Big Bass Lake
 Cedar Lake
 Cripple Lake
 Cyphers Lake
 Gadbolt Lake
 Gould Lake (southwest three-quarters)
 Howard Lake
 Leech Lake
 Leech Lake (west edge)
 Lembke Lake
 Little Bass Lake
 Lake 34
 Lake Alice
 Lake Bess
 Lake May
 Long Lake
 Lost Lake
 Million Lake
 Muskrat Lake
 Portage Lake
 Scoffner Lake
 Stanley Lake
 Ten Lake
 Tenmile Lake (north quarter)
 Upper Fifth Lake
 Wheeler Lake

Adjacent townships
 Leech Lake Township (north)
 Turtle Lake Township (east)
 Hiram Township (south)
 White Oak Township, Hubbard County (southwest)
 Akeley Township, Hubbard County (west)
 Steamboat River Township, Hubbard County (west)
 Lakeport Township, Hubbard County (northwest)

Cemeteries
The township contains Pagan Cemetery.

Demographics
As of the census of 2000, there were 1,745 people, 652 households, and 487 families residing in the township. There were 1,194 housing units at an average density of 22.2/sq mi (8.6/km). The racial makeup of the township was 84.01% White, 0.40% African American, 13.70% Native American, 0.11% Asian, 0.40% from other races, and 1.38% from two or more races. Hispanic or Latino of any race were 1.15% of the population.

There were 652 households, out of which 27.5% had children under the age of 18 living with them, 62.6% were married couples living together, 6.6% had a female householder with no husband present, and 25.3% were non-families. 22.2% of all households were made up of individuals, and 9.5% had someone living alone who was 65 years of age or older.  The average household size was 2.44 and the average family size was 2.81.

In the township the population was spread out, with 22.8% under the age of 18, 4.0% from 18 to 24, 21.9% from 25 to 44, 31.0% from 45 to 64, and 20.2% who were 65 years of age or older.  The median age was 46 years. For every 100 females, there were 108.0 males.  For every 100 females age 18 and over, there were 106.3 males.

The median income for a household in the township was $41,818, and the median income for a family was $46,964. Males had a median income of $31,350 versus $24,219 for females. The per capita income for the township was $20,407.  About 7.8% of families and 13.0% of the population were below the poverty line, including 14.9% of those under age 18 and 19.0% of those age 65 or over.

References
 United States National Atlas
 United States Census Bureau 2007 TIGER/Line Shapefiles
 United States Board on Geographic Names (GNIS)

Townships in Cass County, Minnesota
Brainerd, Minnesota micropolitan area
Leech Lake
Townships in Minnesota